Drank may refer to:

 Drank (soft drink), a grape flavored 'anti-energy' drink 
 Purple drank, a recreational drug
 "Drank", a song by Girlicious from the 2010 album Rebuilt

See also
 
 Drink
 Drunk